Nanjing Man (Homo erectus nankinensis) is a subspecies of Homo erectus found in China. Large fragments of one male and one female skull and a molar tooth of H. e. nankinensis were discovered in 1993 in the Hulu Cave (葫芦洞) on the Tangshan (汤山) hills in Jiangning District, Nanjing. The term Nanjing man is used to describe the subspecies of Homo erectus but is also used when referring to the three fossils. The specimens were found in the Hulu limestone cave at a depth of 60–97 cm by Liu Luhong, a local worker. Dating the fossils yielded an estimated age of 580,000 to 620,000 years old.

Discovery
In March 1993, local labourer Liu Luhong discovered two partial skull fragments (Nanjing 1 and 2), the first retaining most of the face, and an upper molar (Nanjing 3).

The mammal assemblage indicated Huludong was roughly contemporaneous with the Zhoukoudian cave site near Beijing, home of the Peking Man (the reason why the IVPP joined in the first place).

Age determination 
Researchers used mass spectrometric U-series dating to identify the age of the skulls. Best estimates date the skull to be at least 580,000 years old. This research, done in 2001 estimates the age of the skulls to be 270,000 years older than previous estimates, executed with the use of different dating methods like Electron spin resonance dating and alpha-counting U-series. However, by using mass spectrometric U-series dating, the age for the tooth found on the Nanjing site was estimated to be only 400,000 years old. Researchers propose that the enamel used to date the tooth may not have the same uranium uptake as the skulls, leading to the discrepancy in estimated age. Another study from 1999 estimated one skull to be at least 500,000 years old, while they date the other skull being between 250,000 and 500,000 years old using the TIMS dating method.

Impact of the Nanjing fossils 
Homo erectus occupation of Eastern Asia was an established idea well before the discovery of Homo erectus nankinensis. Nanjing man is one of several middle Pleistocene dated Homo erectus fossil finds in eastern China, the most well known of which is Peking man. However dating the Nanjing man fossils between 580,000 YA and 620,000 YA pushed the estimate for Homo erectus colonisation of eastern Asia almost 270,000 years earlier.

The Nanjing man fossil discovery coincided with the paleo-anthropological debate on the population dynamics of modern humans and their relation to other species of the genus Homo. The characteristics of the new subspecies Homo erectus nankinensis and in particular the age of the fossils provided additional evidence which was used to support the multi-regional hypothesis. The extended occupation of East Asia by Homo erectus suggested by the dating of the Nanjing fossils supports the hypothesis that a transitional species between Homo erectus subspecies of Asia and pre-modern Homo sapiens existed. A scientific consensus on the dispersal of Homo sapiens throughout the globe was reached in the early 21st century. However, the influence of East Asian Homo erectus subspecies on modern humans ancestry remains unclear.

Morphological features of the Nanjing man fossils such as cranial capacity and the size a various cranial metrics differ significantly from other Chinese hominin subspecies. Despite this morphometric and morphological features fall well within the range expected for Homo erectus. A high diversity in cranial morphological features in Chinese subspecies of Homo erectus has been identified in a number of studies

Present location 
The skull fragments collected at Hulu cave are currently displayed the Nanjing Homo erectus fossil museum along with other education information about Nanjing man and colonisation of China by Homo erectus.

References

External links
 Human Timeline (Interactive) – Smithsonian, National Museum of Natural History (August 2016).

Homo erectus
History of Nanjing
Prehistoric China